Medicinal Plants Orito Ingi-Ande Flora Sanctuary is a protected area in Colombia. The sanctuary is localized in Southern Colombia, Departments of Putumayo and Nariño in the municipalities of Orito (Putumayo) and Funes & Pasto in (Nariño) south side of Cerro Patascoy. In this area they keep medical plants from harm and destruction.

The Sanctuary was established to protect rare plants and animals, including medicinal plants like the yoco plant.

External links 
  The park's page at Parques Nacionales Naturales de Colombia

Protected areas of Colombia
Protected areas established in 2008
Geography of Putumayo Department
Geography of Nariño Department
National parks of Colombia